Amuri may refer to:

Amuri, Cook Islands
Amuri, New Zealand
Amuri, Pakistan
Amuri, Tampere, Finland